is a Japanese manga series by Fumi Saimon that was serialized in Shogakukan's Big Comic Spirits. It won the Shogakukan Manga Award for general manga in 1992.

Cast
Hikari Ishida as Narumi Sonoda
Michitaka Tsutsui as Tamotsu Kakei
Takuya Kimura as Osamu Toride
Anju Suzuki as Seika Higashiyama
Hidetoshi Nishijima as Junichiro Matsuoka
Ayako Sugiyama as Kyoko Machida
Yumi Morio as Harumi Sonoda
Mariko Kaga as Mitsuko Kakei
Koichi Iwaki as Sosuke Akiba

Synopsis
A coming of age story that follows five young university students who form a circle of friends. Tamotsu and Osamu (Kimura) fall in love with Narumi, who prefers Tamotsu. In order not to hurt each other as friends, both young men try to avoid forming a relationship with Narumi, which inadvertently leads to tragedy among the friends. After the accidental death of Junichiro, the friends leave university for various reasons, leaving Narumi to  continue and finish her studies. A few years later they all meet again and are surprised by the secrets that are revealed.

Live-action drama

Japanese TV drama
The series was adapted as a live-action television drama. It first aired in Japan from 11 October 1993 to 20 December 1993 on Fuji TV, and had an overall viewer rating of 31.9%, making it one of the most popular television dramas of the 1990s. It features music by S.E.N.S. and Fujii Fumiya (True Love), Touge Keiko (Hitosaji no Yuuki) and Fujii Fumiya (Just Like Wind).

Kimura Takuya's acting received critical acclaim and his famous line, "Am I not good enough for you?" has become a famous saying amongst young people and the entertainment world.  This drama paved the way to Kimura Takuya's stardom in "Long Vacation" (1996).

Taiwanese TV drama

In 2002, the manga was adapted into a Taiwanese drama titled Tomorrow starring Rainie Yang, Shawn Yue, Christine Fan and Eddie Peng. It was broadcast in Taiwan on China Television (CTV) (中視).

Taiwanese TV drama

In 2019, the manga was adapted into a Taiwanese drama titled Brave to Love starring Kingone Wang, Ting-hu Zhang, Gingle Wang, Edison Song, Sylvia Hsieh and Andy Wu. It will broadcast in Taiwan on Taiwan Television (TTV) (台視).

References

External links
SMAP WONDERLAND - White Paper
JDrama entry

1992 manga
1993 comics endings
1993 Japanese television series debuts
1993 Japanese television series endings
Fuji TV dramas
Japanese television dramas based on manga
Manga adapted into television series
Seinen manga
Shogakukan manga
Winners of the Shogakukan Manga Award for general manga